Tehvandi Sports Center is a complex of sports facilities in Otepää Parish, Estonia.

It includes multi-purpose stadium (athletics and football), ski stadium, ski jumping hill K90 and biathlon shooting ranges.

History 
It has been a site for FIS Cross-Country World Cup 15 times, first held in 1999 and most recently in the 2018–19 season.

In 2011, it held the Nordic Junior World Ski Championships.

It was scheduled to become a site for the Nordic combined World Cup event in the 2017–18 season, but was cancelled due to lack of snow and warm temperatures. It successfully hosted the event in the next season.

In 2018, it held the Biathlon Junior World Championships.

In March 2022, it hosted the Biathlon World Cup event for the first time.

2027 Biathlon World Championships will be held in Otepää.

Gallery

References

External links

 

Sports venues in Estonia
Otepää Parish
Ski areas and resorts in Estonia